The 2015 Gravesham Borough Council election took place on 7 May 2015 to elect members of the Gravesham Borough Council in England. It was held on the same day as other local elections. The Conservative Party gained control of the council from the Labour Party.

Ward results

Central

Chalk

Coldharbour

Higham

Istead Rise

Meopham North

Meopham South and Vigo

Northfleet North

Northfleet South

Painters Ash

Pelham

Riverside

Riverview

Shorne, Cobham & Luddesdown

Singlewell

Westcourt

Whitehill

Woodlands

References

2015 English local elections
May 2015 events in the United Kingdom
2015
2010s in Kent